The 109th Rifle Division was a Red Army infantry division that was formed three times, briefly in 1939, during 1942, and again from 1942-45. The first formation of the division was converted to a mechanized division after about nine months. Its second formation served for six months in 1942 in the defense of the fortress of Sevastopol, in the southern sector of the siege lines. After being destroyed there in July, a third division was formed by re-designating an existing rifle division near Leningrad in August, and it successfully held its positions for nearly a year and a half, in spite of shortages of food and supplies due to the German/Finnish siege. The 109th then participated in the offensive that drove the Germans away from the city in early 1944, helped drive Finland out of the war, and then joined the offensive along the Baltic coast towards Germany. This third formation compiled an admirable record of service, but was disbanded in 1946.

1st Formation 
The first 109th Rifle Division began forming at Tatarsk in the Novosibirsk Oblast on April 15, 1939, based on a cadre provided by the 79th Rifle Regiment of the 73rd Rifle Division. Col. Nikolai Pavlovich Krasnoretzkiy was appointed to command on June 1, and he would hold that post through this formation's existence. In January 1940, the division moved to Kharanor to be reorganized as the 109th Motorized Division.

2nd Formation 
The division was reformed by the re-designation of the third formation of the 2nd Rifle Division in January 1942 at Sevastopol. It consisted of, in part:
 381st Rifle Regiment - re-designated from the 1330th Rifle Regiment
 456th Rifle Regiment - formed from a mixed NKVD Regiment
 602nd Rifle Regiment - re-designated from the 383rd Rifle Regiment
 404th Artillery Regiment - re-designated from the 51st Artillery Regiment

It was part of the Separate Coastal Army, where it served for the duration of its existence. In the final defense of the Sevastopol Fortress, the 109th fought as part of the "First Sector", and its divisional commander, Maj. Gen. Pyotr Georgyevich Novikov, also served as the Sector commander. The division was tasked with the defense of the high ground that blocked German entry into Balaclava; in fact, the 456th Rifle Regiment held the same area where the British 93rd Highland Regiment made its famous "Thin Red Line" stand in October 1854.

In spite of directions from above, the commander of German XXX Army Corps began an attack on the 109th on June 7, 1942, as part of the overall final offensive against Sevastopol. 456th Rifle Regiment inflicted heavy casualties, in part through antiaircraft and sniper fire, while the 381st Regiment, initially taken by surprise, also threw back the enemy with heavy losses. After four more days of piecemeal attacks, the German corps had suffered over 1,000 casualties for no gains. A larger-scale offensive, with armor support, began on June 11, and captured Ruin Hill from the 602nd Regiment. Despite this the division continued to resist strongly; unfortunately the adjoining 388th Rifle Division defending the village of Kamary was not faring so well. Novikov decided to attempt to relieve one regiment of that division in place on the night of June 12/13, but this move was detected by the Germans who successfully launched an attack to disrupt it. Late in the afternoon of the 13th, with Soviet defenses in the center of the sector in disorder, a further German assault overwhelmed and routed the 602nd. While the rest of the division continued to hold firm, Novikov had no option but to pull his forces back 1,000 - 1,500 metres on June 16 roughly along the line of the Sapun Heights.

A lull set in over the next few days, but on the night of June 28/29 German Eleventh Army launched its final assault all along the line. By the end of this disastrous day for the Soviet defenders the 109th was still relatively intact, but concentrated around Balaclava. Realizing he was about to be cut off, Novikov ordered his division to force-march toward Coastal Battery 35 on the Chersonese Peninsula, where he formed a defensive perimeter with about 50,000 men, mostly stragglers. He was handed command of the Separate Coastal Army on the 30th as the Soviet leadership fled; when he tried to follow in a sub-chaser on July 2 the ship was intercepted and sunk, and Novikov was captured. 456th Rifle Regiment made a last stand around Coastal Battery 18, but by the evening of July 4 all the remaining forces on the peninsula were destroyed or captured. The 109th Rifle Division was officially stricken from the Soviet order of battle on July 30.

3rd Formation 
The division was reformed on August 6, 1942 at Pulkovo in the 42nd Army of Leningrad Front from the 21st NKVD Rifle Division, which had been involved in the defense of the city for the previous twelve months. Its partial order of battle became:
 381st Rifle Regiment - from the 6th NKVD Rifle Regiment
 456th Rifle Regiment - from the 8th NKVD Rifle Regiment
 602nd Rifle Regiment - from the 14th NKVD Rifle Regiment
 404th Artillery Regiment
 339th Antitank Battalion
 229th Sapper Battalion.
Upon its redesignation the division was under the command of Col. Mikhail Danilovich Papchenko, but he was replaced within a week by Col. Nikolai Andreevich Trushkin. Trushkin was promoted to Major General on April 21, 1943, and remained in this post for most of the rest of the war.

Just prior to its re-designation, between July 20–23, the division had taken part in an attack on the German-held fortified village of Staro-Panovo, southwest of the city, which succeeded in liberating the village and part of the adjoining Uritsk. Although the gains were small, it was the first time the German siege lines had been pushed back and held, boosting the morale of the defenders.

In the late autumn the division was relieved from front-line duty for nearly a month for rebuilding and replenishment, then was deployed again to the Pulkovo sector, now facing the Spanish Blue Division. The Spanish were withdrawn from this sector on January 6, 1943, replaced by the German 23rd Infantry Division.

The 109th became part (somewhat confusingly) of the 109th Rifle Corps from November 1943, and remained in that Corps for the duration. In January 1944, 109th Corps left 42nd Army and was transferred to the 2nd Shock Army in the Oranienbaum Bridgehead. Later that month 2nd Shock took a leading part in the offensive that finally drove the German forces away from Leningrad.

In May, the 109th was transferred north to the 21st Army facing the Finnish forces in Karelia. The division helped to penetrate the second Finnish defensive belt on June 14, capturing several strongpoints; following this, it continued to advance on the right flank of its Army, reaching positions about 15 km east of Viipuri by July 15. On June 22 the division was awarded the battle honor "Leningrad" as well as the Order of the Red Banner for its role in this campaign.

With Finland out of the war, the 109th made its final transfer, to 8th Army in Estonia, near Narva, in August. Until the end of the war it assisted in clearing the Baltic coast as far as the Courland Peninsula. On several occasions the division served as a "follow-on" force in amphibious operations against German forces on the Baltic islands, but it never led an amphibious assault landing. On December 16, General Trushkin left command of the division to Col. Moiseiy Yakovlevich Mones, but returned to the division on February 28, 1945.

The division ended the war as the 109th Rifle, Leningrad, Order of the Red Banner Division (Russian: 109-я стрелковая Ленинградская Краснознамённая дивизия).

Postwar 
The division was withdrawn with the 6th Rifle Corps to the Don Military District and was disbanded in spring 1946.

References

Citations

Bibliography
 
  pp. 152, 337

External links
Pyotr Georgievich Novikov
Nikolai Andreevich Trushkin

109
Military units and formations established in 1939
Military units and formations established in 1942
Military units and formations disestablished in 1946
Military units and formations awarded the Order of the Red Banner
Continuation War